Thomas Craig Nelson (born 1961/1962) is an American businessman, and the chairman, CEO and president of National Gypsum, a company wholly owned by the Spangler family, since 1999.

Early life
He is the son of Mr and Mrs Nels Richard Nelson of Glenview, Illinois, an IBM marketing executive in Chicago. His parents are both immigrants from Sweden.

Education 
Nelson earned a bachelor's degree in industrial engineering from Stanford University in 1984, and an MBA from Harvard Business School in 1988.

Career
Nelson was vice chairman and chief financial officer of National Gypsum from 1995 to 1999, and has been the chairman, CEO and president since 1999.

Personal life
In 1990, Nelson married Anna Wildy Spangler, a Wellesley College graduate, a fellow 1988 Harvard Business School graduate, and a fellow partner in Wakefield Group, a Charlotte, N.C. venture capital firm. She is the daughter of Clemmie Spangler.

They have two daughters, and live in Charlotte, North Carolina.

References

Living people
Stanford University alumni
Harvard Business School alumni
People from Glenview, Illinois
Spangler family
1960s births
American chief executives
American people of Swedish descent